William Portman (died 1557) was an English judge and Chief Justice of the King’s Bench.

William Portman may also refer to:

William Portman (died c. 1413), MP for Taunton
Sir William Portman, 5th Baronet (died 1646), English politician
Sir William Portman, 6th Baronet (1643–1690), English politician
William Portman (priest), Irish Anglican clergyman